= Facies diaphragmatica =

Facies diaphragmatica or diaphragmatic surface can refer to:

- Diaphragmatic surface of heart (facies diaphragmatica cordis)
- Diaphragmatic surface of lung (facies diaphragmatica pulmonis)
- Diaphragmatic surface of liver (facies diaphragmatica hepatis)
- Diaphragmatic surface of spleen (facies diaphragmatica splenica)
